William H. "Biff" Grimes (born July 25, 1950) is an American food writer, former magazine writer, culture reporter, theater columnist, restaurant critic, book reviewer and a current obituary writer for The New York Times. He is the author of four books on food and drink in the United States, including the recent work Appetite City: A Culinary History of New York.

Early life and education
Grimes was born in Houston, Texas. In 1973, he obtained a B. A. in English from Indiana University Bloomington where he graduated with honors. In 1974, he received a M. A. in English from the University of Chicago and in 1982 earned his Ph.D. in comparative literature. He also received a Whiting Fellowship.

Career
In April 1999, Grimes was named restaurant critic at The New York Times. Prior, he served as a reporter in the style department, where he wrote in the dining section since September 1997. From October 1991 until September 1997 he worked as a reporter on the cultural desk where he reviewed independent film, visual art, and books.

Grimes joined The New York Times in May 1989 as a story editor and writer. Before working for The Times, he was the executive editor for Avenue Magazine from September 1986 to May 1989 while also contributing to The New York Times Magazine.

He was a copy editor for Esquire from April 1984 to September 1986. He also wrote on cocktails for the magazine.

From April 1980 to April 1984, he was associate editor of Macmillan Publishing where he worked to translate the Great Soviet Encyclopedia into English.

Grimes features prominently in the 2017 documentary, Obit, about the New York Times obituaries desk.

Awards and honors
In 1998, Grimes was nominated for a James Beard Foundation award for his work on a Dining article titled, "Is America Ready for Bunny Ragout?" In 1993, he was awarded the Press Club of Long Island award for his reporting for "Who Painted this Picture?"

Personal
Grimes is married and he and his wife live in Astoria, Queens.

Bibliography
 Appetite City: A Culinary History of New York (October 13, 2009)
 Straight Up or On the Rocks: The Story of the American Cocktail (October 2002)
 My Fine Feathered Friend (May 2002)
 Straight Up or on the Rocks: A Cultural History of American Drink (April 1993)

References

External links

Living people
1959 births
Journalists from Houston
Indiana University alumni
University of Chicago alumni
The New York Times writers
American theater critics
American art critics
American restaurant critics
Obituary writers